Kamdini, also referred to as Kamdini Corder, is a town in the Northern Region of Uganda.

Location
Kamdini is in the Oyam District of the Lango sub-region. The coordinates of the town are 2°14'47.0"N, 32°19'52.0"E (Latitude:2.246402; Longitude: 32.331120).

Overview
Kamdini lies at the junction of three major roads in Uganda. The Kiryandongo-Kamdini Road, the Gulu–Kamdini Road, and the Lira-Kamdini Road, with all meeting in the center of town.

See also
Langi people
Murchison Falls National Park
List of cities and towns in Uganda
List of roads in Uganda

References

External links
Noise Is Order of The Day In Oyam
Uganda: Government secures $400m World Bank loan for roads

Populated places in Northern Region, Uganda
Cities in the Great Rift Valley
Oyam District